Spinner was an online music and entertainment service. An AOL Music property, it was acquired by AOL on June 1, 1999, along with Nullsoft for $400 million. Based in San Francisco, California, the website was the first Internet music service and was the largest by 2001, while offering promotional features from high-profile recording artists. In 2002, AOL combined Spinner with the former's Netscape portal to form Netscape Radio. Spinner broadcast over 100 radio stations, including Radio CMJ.

In 2008, Spinner was revamped by AOL as a music website aimed at the "music aficionado". The website offers exclusive interviews of recording artists, streams of albums and live performances, and a free music download daily.

Spinner, along with all AOL music sites, was abruptly shut down in April 2013. The URLs to all former AOL music sites, including Spinner, were re-directed to aolradio.slacker.com starting in August 2013. Several AOL Music blogs, along with Comics Alliance, were sold to Townsquare Media in June 2013.

References

Bibliography

External links
 

Defunct software companies of the United States
Internet radio in the United States
Media players
Internet properties established in 2006
Internet properties disestablished in 2013